Jalil Shahnaz (22 May 1921 – 17 June 2013; Persian: جلیل شهناز) was a Persian classical music musician and a virtuoso of the Persian musical instrument, tar.

Biography 
Jalil Shahnaz was born in 1921 in Isfahan, Persia (Iran). Shahnaz studied under the supervision of his brother, Hossein Shahnaz, and befriended Hassan Kassai, a ney player.

According to the book Persian Musicians by Pejman Akbarzadeh: "Shahnaz started his activities in 1949 at Radio Isfahan and in 1957 he was invited to cooperate with Radio Tehran.  In the capital he worked as a soloist at ''Golha program'' and also later he was quite active at Persian music programs of Shiraz/Persepolis Arts Festival. Shahnaz in the late 1980s became a member of "Persian Music Maestros Ensemble". The ensemble performed various concerts inside and outside of Persia."

Persian classical vocalist Shajarian named his most recent musical group "Shahnaz" in honor of Maestro Shahnaz.

Shahnaz died in Tehran on 17 June 2013.

Works
 "Atr Afshan" (tar solo, accompanied by Mohammad Esmaeili, tombak).
 "Zaban-e tar" (tar solo, accompanied by Jahangir Malek, tombak). 
 "15 Pieces for Tar & Setar" (transcribed by Houshang Zarif). Soroud Publications, Tehran, 2000.

See also
Persian classical music
Music of Iran
List of Iranian musicians

References

1921 births
Iranian composers
Iranian tar players
Persian classical musicians
2013 deaths
Recipients of the Order of Culture and Art
Iranian Science and Culture Hall of Fame recipients in Music